Bsharri District (often spelled Bsharre, Bcharre or Bcharreh) is one of the 7 districts (qadaa, قضاء) of the North Governorate, Lebanon.

Overview and geography
Surrounded by mountains, the Bsharri District sits on cliffs. The district is bordered by the Zgharta and Miniyeh-Danniyeh Districts to the north, the Koura District to the west, the Baalbek District to the east, and the Batroun District to the south.

This district is a grouping of 26 villages and most are at an elevation higher than 1,000 meters. It also contains one of the most important landmarks of Eastern Christianity and Maronite history, the major part of the Kadisha Valley, the Qannoubin Valley where Hermits have resided since around the year 600 C.E., the last being Father Antonios Tarabay (fr) whose file in the Vatican is progressing toward beatification. He lived most of his life in the ancient monastery of Saint Elisha located in a grotto deep in the Qannoubin Valley. In this valley, there are more than 26 monasteries all more than 1,000 years old. At the top of this valley sits the legendary cedar forest, the Cedars of God.

Population

The population of the district was estimated to be 76,831 by the Ministry of Social Affairs. The capital of the district is Bsharri. The Ministry's estimate lacks credibility. According to the Daily Star, an English language Lebanese newspaper, a total of 40,000 people in the district voted in the 2005 elections.  In addition, the Ministry of Social Affairs estimates that 39% of the Lebanese population was under 20 years of age which meant they were not eligible to vote and a 60% participation rate. Considering these factors the population may be more realistically estimated at 100,000 people.

Religion and history 
The Bsharri district is predominantly Maronite Christian. Having some 37 churches, Bsharri is sometimes called the "City of Churches." Five saints recognized by the Catholic Church hailed from Lebanon. The most prominent is Saint Charbel from Bekaa Kafra, the town with the highest elevation in the district. Many people from Lebanon and other countries in the world greatly honor Saint Charbel, known for his miracles of healing for Christians, Muslims, and those from all religious backgrounds who visit his hometown, seeking his intercession.

Bsharri has deep religious roots for Christianity, as Maronites used the caves within the cliffs to hide and escape religious persecution. These caves could not be reached by horses or heavily armed soldiers. The area survived several invasions including the Ottoman Empire invasion that was marked for its brutality. This Maronite stronghold became a refuge for persecuted Christians in the area, given its geographic characteristics with protective mountains for the towns stretched around the valley. During winter, the snow covers the mountains, and this further isolates the area as it becomes accessible only from two edges at the beginning of Kadisha valley, which translates to the "Holy Valley." This location played a crucial and historical role through the years for the persecuted Maronites who fled to Bsharri.

Cedars of Lebanon 

The cedars of Lebanon are also known as the Cedars of God and are mentioned 103 times in the Bible.  Historically, the timber of these trees was exploited by numerous empires that crossed Lebanon, including the Phoenicians, Assyrians, Egyptians, Turks, Romans, Arabs, Israelites, Persians, and Babylonians. The trees were used by Solomon to build the Temple in Jerusalem and by the Phoenicians to build merchant ships; the resin was used by the Egyptians for mummification. The cedars forest used to grow and thrive across Mount Lebanon and only 375 trees remain today.  The cedar tree on the Lebanese flag represents a national symbol, as Lebanon is referred to as the Land of the Cedars and symbolizes eternity, prosperity, and steadiness.

Notable People 
Khalil Gibran, a writer, painter, sculptor, and philosopher was born and raised in Bsharri prior to immigrating to the United States of America.

Anthony Peter Arida, bishop of the Maronite Catholic Archeparchy of Tripoli and 73rd Maronite Patriarch of Antioch was born in Bqerqacha.

Towns and villages

References

 
Districts of Lebanon
North Governorate